The Catechism of a Revolutionary refers to a manifesto written by Russian revolutionary Sergey Nechayev between April and August 1869.

Background
The manifesto is a manual for the formation of secret societies.

It is debated how much input Mikhail Bakunin had or if it is solely the work of Nechayev. The work called for total devotion to a revolutionary lifestyle. Its publication in the Government Herald in July 1871 as the manifesto of the Narodnaya Rasprava secret society ("Общество народной расправы") was one of the most dramatic events of Nechayev's revolutionary life, through its words and the actions it inspired establishing Nechayev's importance for the Nihilist movement.

Content 
The Catechism is divided into two sections; General Rules of the Organisation and Rules of Conduct of Revolutionaries, 22 and 26 paragraphs long respectively; abridged versions were published as excerpts in the anarchist periodicals Freiheit and The Alarm.

The most radical document of its age, the Catechism outlined the authors' revolutionary Jacobin program of organisation and discipline, a program that became the backbone of the radical movement in Russia. The revolutionary is portrayed in the Catechism as an amoral avenging angel, an expendable resource in the service of the revolution, committed to any crime or treachery necessary to effect the downfall of the prevailing order.

Reception
Critics of anarchism argue that the Catechism reflects the innately violent and nihilistic nature of the philosophy. Scholar Michael Allen Gillespie has hailed the Catechism as "a pre-eminent expression of the doctrine of freedom and negation" that arose in the Fichtean notion of the "Absolute I" that had been concealed in Left Hegelianism. Prominent Black Panther of the 20th century Eldridge Cleaver adopted the Catechism as a "revolutionary bible", incorporating it into his daily life to the extent that he employed, in his words, "tactics of ruthlessness in my dealings with everyone with whom I came into contact".

The journal Cahiers du monde russe et soviétique published a letter from Bakunin to Nechayev, in which Bakunin wrote, "You remember how you were angry with me, when I called you abrek and called your Catechism the Catechism of abreks?"

See also
 Russian nihilist movement
 Anarchism and violence
 Professional revolutionaries
 Demons, an 1872 novel by Fyodor Dostoevsky influenced by the events surrounding the publication of the Catechism.

Footnotes

References

External links

 Nechayev, The Revolutionary Catechism

1869 books
Anarchist manifestos
Nihilist works
Russian non-fiction books
Anarchism in Russia
1869 documents